Point Lookout Light is a lighthouse that marks the entrance to the Potomac River at the southernmost tip of Maryland's western shore of the Chesapeake Bay, south of the town of Scotland in Saint Mary's County, Maryland, USA. It is known for its association with ghost stories and has been the subject of paranormal investigations. The lighthouse is located in Point Lookout State Park. It is not open to the public.

History
On May 3, 1825, the federal government decided that a light was needed at Point Lookout to warn ships of the shoals and to mark the entrance to the Potomac River, and appropriated $1,800 for the project. The owner, Jenifer Taylor, refused the offer of $500 for the land, though he apparently offered to accept this price if he were named keeper. The purchase was delayed and eventually a county commission set a value of $1,150. Because of the cost overruns for the land purchase, Congress appropriated $4,500 on May 23, 1828, and awarded a contract on July 22, 1830, to John Donahoo for $3,050.  Construction commenced before the deed to the land was obtained and Jenifer Taylor argued with the government until the matter was resolved some 2 years after the lighthouse became operational. Donahoo built a story-and-a-half house which was first lit on September 20, 1830 by keeper James Davis. Davis died a few months after taking the oath of office and his daughter, Ann Davis, kept the light until 1847.

In 1854, the light was upgraded with a fourth-order Fresnel lens. The Civil War completely transformed the point. First, the Hammond General Hospital was built in 1862 to care for Union wounded. In 1863, Confederate prisoners began to be held at the hospital; and soon Camp Hoffman, a vast prison camp, was built, eventually holding 20,000 prisoners, of whom more than 3,000 died due to the harsh conditions, limited food rations and poor shelter from the elements.

A fog bell tower was added in 1873. In 1883, the lighthouse was raised to two full stories with a summer kitchen and additional bedroom added at the southwest corner. Also in 1883, a buoy repair depot was built on the south side of the light; in 1884, a coal storage shed was built to the south of the buoy repair depot.  The new structures obscured the fog bell, which was then replaced with a new fog bell on the east end of the coal storage shed. In 1927, the lighthouse was converted to a duplex, more than doubling the size of the building.  The duplex allowed for a keeper and assistant keeper to live on-site and still have some privacy.

The light was served by civilian and Coast Guard keepers. In 1939, the United States Coast Guard took over control of all U.S. lighthouses, and the keepers were pressured, but not required, to join the Coast Guard. In 1951, the United States Navy began buying property around the light. On January 11, 1966, the light was deactivated and the structures were turned over to the Navy. Civilians continued to live in the house until 1981, when a dispute over a failing well led to the revocation of a 99-year lease that the state had with the Navy.

The fog bell tower was moved to the Chesapeake Bay Maritime Museum in 1968. Throughout the 1960s, the State of Maryland purchased land north of the lighthouse and carved out the Point Lookout State Park. In 2006, the light was turned over to Maryland as part of a land-swap deal. Also in 2006, the Point Lookout Lighthouse Preservation Society was founded to restore the lighthouse complex to the 1927 era. The lighthouse is owned by Maryland and is accessible one day a month from April to November by volunteers of the Point Lookout Lighthouse Preservation Society. The group also holds night time "paranormal investigations" to raise funds for preservation and restoration activities. The haunted reputation is a dual-edged sword, and has caused severe damage to historically significant parts of the lighthouse due to vandals breaking into the lighthouse. While unusual things have happened at the lighthouse, it is unclear who, how or why the lighthouse is referred to as the most haunted lighthouse in America. Several television shows have dedicated segments to the lighthouse, including Mystery Hunters, Weird Travels and Haunted Lighthouses.

Sources

Point Lookout Light, from the Chesapeake Chapter of the United States Lighthouse Society
Point Lookout Lighthouse, from Lighthousefriends

External links
 Point Lookout Lighthouse
 Point Lookout Lighthouse Preservation Society, Inc.
 
 Chesapeake Bay Lighthouse Project - Point Lookout Light

Lighthouses completed in 1830
Houses completed in 1830
Lighthouses in St. Mary's County, Maryland
Potomac River
Lighthouses in the Chesapeake Bay
Reportedly haunted locations in Maryland
1830 establishments in Maryland